Anders Henrik Bull (25 January 1875 – after 1909) was an American-born Norwegian electrical engineer.

Early life and education 
Bull was born in Minneapolis as the son of ophthalmologist Ole Bornemann Bull (1842–1916) and his first wife Marie Cathrine Lund (1843–1884). The family moved to Norway in 1876. He took his engineering education in Kristiania and Hanover.

Career 
Bull returned to Norway from Hannover in 1901, and became noted in the engineering community for his pioneering work on wireless telegraphy. He also worked for Norsk Hydro, as a consultant to Kristian Birkeland, from 1906 to 1909, in that company's formative phase. He married Agnes Emilie Rosenkvist, née Lund, in November 1908. They later remigrated to the United States.

He was awarded the Louis E. Levy Medal in 1943.

Personal life 
Anders Henrik Bull was the brother of Fredrik Rosing Bull, and a half-brother of Jens Bull and Johan Bull.

References

Norwegian electrical engineers
Norsk Hydro people
Norwegian expatriates in the United States
Norwegian expatriates in Germany
1875 births
Year of death missing